Bluejohn Canyon (often mistakenly referred to as "Blue John Canyon") is a slot canyon in eastern Wayne County, Utah, United States. It is on BLM land just south of the boundary of the Horseshoe Canyon Unit of Canyonlands National Park.

Description
Bluejohn Canyon is probably named for a 19th-century outlaw by the name of John Griffith, who reportedly kept stolen horses in the area. He had one blue eye and one brown eye and was known by the nickname "Blue John".

The main fork also has several tributary canyons of its own. Traversing the entire length of Bluejohn Canyon requires technical canyoneering skills and equipment.

Bluejohn Canyon came to international attention in 2003 as the place where outdoorsman Aron Ralston was forced to amputate his own right forearm with a multi-tool after it became trapped by a boulder. Ralston's five-day ordeal was described in his autobiography Between a Rock and a Hard Place and was depicted in the 2010 film 127 Hours.

See also

 List of canyons and gorges in Utah

References

External links

Canyons and gorges of Utah
Slot canyons
Landforms of Wayne County, Utah